William Guy Wall (1792–1864) was an American painter of Irish birth.

Wall was born in Dublin in 1792 and arrived in New York in 1812. He was already a well trained artist and soon became well known for his sensitive watercolor views of the Hudson River Valley and surroundings. Some of these watercolors were published as engravings by John Hill and his son John William Hill in the Hudson River Portfolio (New York, 1821–1825), one of the first publications to make Americans aware of the beauty of their own country. Wall's landscapes (and a few seascapes) were straightforward representations of America's awe-inspiring vistas—neither romanticized nor idealized. He is classified as either a forerunner or an early member of the Hudson River School. Wall was a founding member of the National Academy of Design (New York) and exhibited frequently at such institutions as the Pennsylvania Academy of the Fine Arts (Philadelphia) and the Apollo Association (New York). He lived in America from 1812 to 1835 and again from 1856 to 1860. He returned to Ireland in 1860 and died in Dublin in 1864. William Guy Wall's son, William Archibald Wall (1828 – 1878), was also a landscape painter.

The Amon Carter Museum (Fort Worth, Texas), the Honolulu Museum of Art, the Hudson River Museum (Yonkers, New York), the Metropolitan Museum of Art and the New-York Historical Society are among the public collections having paintings by William Guy Wall.

References
Howat, John K., "A Picturesque Site in the Catskills: The Kaaterskill Falls as Painted by William Guy Wall", Honolulu Academy of Arts Journal, vol. I, 1974, 16.

External links
ArtCyclopedia
A Hudson River Portfolio
Artwork by William Guy Wall

1792 births
1864 deaths
19th-century American painters
19th-century American male artists
American male painters
American watercolorists
Irish emigrants to the United States (before 1923)
Landscape artists
Painters from Dublin (city)
Hudson River School painters